"My Shining Hour" is a song composed by Harold Arlen with lyrics by Johnny Mercer for the film The Sky's the Limit (1943). In the film, the song is sung by Fred Astaire and Sally Sweetland, who dubbed it for actress Joan Leslie. The orchestra was led by Freddie Slack. "My Shining Hour" was nominated for an Academy Award for Best Song but lost to "You'll Never Know".

The film was released on July 13, 1943. The song became a hit the following year by Glen Gray's Casa Loma Orchestra with Eugenie Baird as vocalist, reaching No. 4 on the Billboard "Best Selling Retail Records" chart.  The song's title may have been a reference to Winston Churchill's speech to British citizens during World War II: "if the British Empire and its Commonwealth last for a thousand years, men will still say, this was their finest hour."

In the 1944 film Youth Runs Wild an instrumental version of the song plays during a scene with Kent Smith and Glen Vernon. The song was also used in the film Radio Stars on Parade (1945) when it was sung by Frances Langford accompanied by the Skinnay Ennis orchestra.  An instrumental version of the song was also used in The Bachelor and the Bobby-Soxer (1947).

Other notable recordings
1943 Mabel Mercer
1953 Dorothy Carless, Dorothy Carless Sings Informally: 4 Songs by Kurt Weill, 4 Songs by Harold Arlen
1955 Warren Galjour,  The Music Of Harold Arlen: The Walden Sessions.
1960 Ella Fitzgerald,  Ella Fitzgerald Sings the Harold Arlen Songbook.
1961 John Coltrane, Coltrane Jazz
1963 Nancy Wilson, Hollywood – My Way
1965 Sammy Davis Jr., Our Shining Hour
1965 Liza Minnelli, It Amazes Me
1977 June Christy, Impromptu (June Christy album)
1980 Frank Sinatra, Trilogy: Past Present Future
1983 Rosemary Clooney, Rosemary Clooney Sings the Music of Harold Arlen
1993 Peggy Lee, Love Held Lightly: Rare Songs by Harold Arlen
1996 Rebecka Törnqvist & Per 'Texas' Johansson, The Stockholm Kaza Session
2006 Barbra Streisand, Live in Concert 2006

References

1940s jazz standards
1943 songs
Barbra Streisand songs
Nancy Wilson (jazz singer) songs
Pop standards
Songs with lyrics by Johnny Mercer
Songs with music by Harold Arlen
Songs written for films